Straight from the Streets is the debut album by Sean T. It was released in 1993 for Murder One Records and was produced by Sean T and G-Man Stan. The album was later re-released on November 14, 2003.

Track listing
"Keep Em' Broke" – 4:10 
"Get Gone" – 4:14 
"Gangsta Shit" – 4:26 
"As A Youngsta" – 5:09 
"All In A Niggas Look" – 5:03 
"Upper Hand" – 4:39 
"Victim of a Jack" – 4:18 
"Stay Off the Dick" – 3:41 
"Straight from the Streets" – 4:33 
"Murder One Gangsta" – 4:49 
"Can't Be Touched" – 4:03 
"A Whole Nutha Level" – 3:56
"Only the Strong Survive" – 4:31 
"Shouts Out" – 4:05

1993 debut albums
Sean T albums